Richard Philip Henry John Benson (10 March 1955 – 10 May 2022) was a British-Italian guitarist, singer and television personality.

Life
Benson was born in Woking, England to a Belgian mother and a British father, both of which had Italian origins. His paternal great grandfather was Samuel Herbert Benson, the founder of the first advertising company in the UK. His grandfather, one of Sir Samuel Herbet Benson's sons, married an Italian model. Richard moved to Italy and was an active musician since his early teens.

In 2000, he suffered a serious leg injury when he fell off a bridge. He claimed that the accident was the result of an assault, but there are suspicions that Benson actually attempted suicide, since he was diagnosed with arthritis shortly before, which is suggested to have greatly impacted his guitar playing and skills. Benson had to undergo prolonged rehabilitation to be able to walk again.

In November 2016, Benson and his wife Ester Esposito appeared in a video on repubblica.it where they revealed financial problems and asked for donations to pay for medical procedures. Benson can be seen stooped and hardly able to walk due to arthritis. It was also revealed that he suffered from heart problems and already had to undergo surgery at that point.

Benson died in Rome on Tuesday 10 of May 2022, at the age of 67.

Musical career
In 1971, Benson recorded with the progressive rock band Buon Vecchio Charlie a self-titled LP, which was only released in 1990 when the original record company brought out some of their early productions on CD. The album features Benson on vocals and 12-string guitar.

In 1972, he took part in the festival Villa Pamphili.

In 1983, he released his first single, "Animal Zoo", an Italo disco production. In the following year he released his second single, "Renegade", a song (along with the B-side "Flash Back") with electro-rock tones.

In 1984, he wrote and recorded music for the cult movie The Incinerator (Italian title L'inceneritore) in which he also appeared in a small role as a street gang member.

In 1987, he produced the compilation album, Metal Attack (RCA Italy – Talent), where he sings on the track Exotic Escape that he also co-wrote.

In 1999, he released a solo album called Madre Tortura, that featured progressive hard-rock tracks. In 2015, he released L'inferno dei vivi on the label INRI, a rock-opera-style concept album with electronic elements, and the accompanying single I Nani.

In 2016, Benson released Duello madre, a digital compilation of tracks from earlier releases.

In September 2019 Benson published several videos on Youtube in which he performs unpublished blues and pop songs on the classical guitar. The music is his work, while the lyrics are written by Cinzia Colibazzi.

TV and movies
During the 1970s and 1980s, Benson hosted various programs about contemporary alternative music on TV and radio. In 1992 he played himself as a TV host in Carlo Verdone's successful film Maledetto il giorno che t'ho incontrato.

In the 1990s and 2000s, Benson often appeared as a guest on RAI, the prime Italian channel, usually judging musicians. His appearances were often over the top and satirical in nature.

Discography

Albums
 1999: Madre Tortura
 2015: L'inferno dei vivi – a rock-opera produced by Federico Zampaglione 
 2016: Duello madre (compilation/digital downloading)

Singles
 1983: "Animal Zoo"
 1984: "Renegade"
 2022: "Processione"

Albums with others
 1990: Buon Vecchio Charlie by Buon Vecchio Charlie (recorded in 1971)

Live bootlegs
 2003: Bootleg Infernale
 2004: Il Natale del Male

References

External links

 
 
 Article on la Repubblica

1955 births
2022 deaths
English male singers
Musicians from Rome
People from Woking
Progressive rock musicians
Blues rock musicians
British emigrants to Italy
English heavy metal guitarists
English heavy metal singers
Italian heavy metal guitarists